Howard William Clark (born 19 September 1968) is an English former footballer who made 136 appearances in the Football League playing for Coventry City, Darlington, Shrewsbury Town and Hereford United. A midfielder or defender, Clark went on to play non-league football for Nuneaton Borough, Crawley Town and Hinckley Town.

Life and career
Clark was born in Coventry. He was associated as a junior with Wolverhampton Wanderers, and joined hometown club Coventry City under the YTS scheme. He turned professional in September 1986, and was a member of the Coventry squad that won the 1986–87 FA Youth Cup. He made his first-team debut at the age of 20, on 5 November 1988, playing the whole of a 1–1 draw at home to West Ham United in the First Division, but never established himself in the first team. He made 20 League appearances over three years, and spent a few weeks on loan at Darlington of the Third Division, before moving to another Third Division club, Shrewsbury Town, on a free transfer in December 1991.

At the end of his first season, Shrewsbury were relegated to the fourth tier, renamed Third Division after the Premier League split from the Football League. He stayed for a season at the lower level, and made 56 league appearances in all. In the 1993 close season, he signed for Third Division Hereford United, where he played under the management of Greg Downs who had been a teammate at Coventry. In his first season, he appeared regularly, but less so in 1994–95, at the end of which he left the club for Southern League football with, successively, Nuneaton Borough, Crawley Town and Hinckley Town.

He retired from football in 1996 and joined the West Midlands Police.

References

External links

1968 births
Living people
Footballers from Coventry
English footballers
Association football midfielders
Association football defenders
Coventry City F.C. players
Darlington F.C. players
Shrewsbury Town F.C. players
Hereford United F.C. players
Nuneaton Borough F.C. players
Crawley Town F.C. players
Hinckley Town F.C. players
English Football League players
Southern Football League players